Ninh Bình station is a railway station in the center of Ninh Bình, Vietnam. It lies on the North–South railway. In 2015, VTC commented that Ninh Bình station was the most beautiful and modern railway station in Vietnam.

History 

The old station was built near Ninh Bình bridge and Đáy River. In the past, it accommodated passenger and freight trains. In the First Indochina War, the station was closed. Despite the fierce bombing, many trains still operated in order to carry soldiers, food and weapons to fight against the French.

A new station opened in June 2015 to replace the old one.

Site 
The station was upgraded from 4 to 11 tracks to serve more passengers, freight trains and to allow repairs.

References

Buildings and structures in Ninh Bình province
Railway stations in Vietnam